Constituencies in 1974–1983 | 1983 MPs | 1987 MPs | 1992 MPs | Constituencies in 1997–2001

This is a list of all constituencies that were in existence in the 1983 and 1987 General Elections.  Apart from one seat (Milton Keynes, which was split into Milton Keynes South West and Milton Keynes North East) the same seats were used in the 1992 General Election.



A

B

C

D

E

F

G

H

I

J

K

L

M

N

O

P

R

S

T

U

V

W

Y

Note: All regions used are those in force when the constituencies were created.

References

1983
1980s in the United Kingdom
1990s in the United Kingdom
1992 United Kingdom general election